Story of a Bad Woman is a 1948 Argentine drama film directed by Luis Saslavsky and starring the Mexican and Hollywood superstar Dolores del Río, María Duval, Alberto Closas. It is based on Lady Windermere's Fan by Oscar Wilde. The film's art direction was by Raúl Soldi. It was made by Argentina Sono Film, one of the country's biggest studios during the era.

Cast
 Dolores del Río as Mrs. Erlynne
 María Duval
 Alberto Closas		
 Fernando Lamas		
 Amalia Sánchez Ariño		
 Homero Cárpena		
 María Santos		
 Bertha Moss		
 Ricardo Castro Ríos		
 Luis Otero		
 Amalia Bernabé		
 Francisco de Paula		
 Roberto Bordoni		
 Aurelia Ferrer		
 Berta Ortegosa		
 Alberto de Mendoza		
 Iris Martorell		
 Manuel Alcón		
 Diana Montes
 Pablo Cumo

References

Bibliography
 Hall, Linda. Dolores del Río: Beauty in Light and Shade. Stanford University Press, 2013.

External links
 

1948 films
1948 drama films
Argentine drama films
1940s Spanish-language films
Argentine black-and-white films
Argentine films based on plays
Films directed by Luis Saslavsky
1940s Argentine films